Addio Alexandra is an Italian  romantic drama film, released in 1969. It stars Pier Angeli, Glenn Saxson and Colette Descombes. The film premiered out of competition at the 30th Venice International Film Festival.

References

External links

1969 films
1960s Italian-language films
1969 romantic drama films
Italian romantic drama films
1960s Italian films